Young, Wild and Free is the first full-length album by Canadian band, Brighton Rock. The album was released in 1986, and spawned the Canadian hit singles; "We Came to Rock" and "Can't Wait for the Night". The album charted at No. 82 in Canada and was certified Gold by the CRIA in 1989. Gerry McGhee announced on April 30, 2013 that Young, Wild and Free will be remastered by Warner Records.

Track listing
All songs by Gerry McGhee and Greg Fraser.
"Young, Wild and Free"
"We Came to Rock"
"Change of Heart"
"Can't Wait for the Night"
"Assault Attack"
"Jack is Back"
"Save Me"
"Nobody's Hero"
"Barricade"
"Rock 'n' Roll Kid"

Personnel
Brighton Rock
Gerry McGhee – vocals
Greg Fraser – guitars
Steve Skreebs – bass guitar
Johnny Rogers – keyboards
Mark Cavarzan – drums

Production
Michael Wagener – producer

Charts

Album

Singles

References
Notes

Bibliography
 Brighton Rock
 RPM Charts

1986 debut albums
Albums produced by Michael Wagener
Brighton Rock (band) albums
Warner Music Group albums